New Clark City is a planned community currently undergoing development, located within the Clark Special Economic Zone in the towns of Bamban and Capas in Tarlac province, Philippines. It is owned and managed by the Bases Conversion and Development Authority (BCDA).

History

Conceptualization
New Clark City, initially known as Clark Green City was first planned, designed and founded by the Bases Conversion Development Authority (BCDA) under the administration of then-BCDA President and CEO Arnel Paciano Casanova in 2012. The then-proposal was met with skepticism from some high-ranking government officials due to the development's proposed location being remote. Casanova envisioned a new metropolis north of Metro Manila to be the first green and smart metropolis of the country. Mr. Casanova was moved to build the new city as a response to the challenges of climate change which placed Metro Manila and many Philippine coastal cities at risk. This was witnessed in the massive floods in Metro Manila during Typhoon Ondoy in 2009 and the destruction of Tacloban City during Typhoon Yolanda in 2013. The imminent threats of climate change made the movement of new communities to higher and safer ground. This will be a development with numerous parks and wide and tree-shaded pedestrian lanes with the application of innovative technologies to run the city. It was also a response to the hellish gridlock that Metro Manila has been experiencing and the imperative of making mobility better and dignified for citizens. He also envisioned the development to be free of gated communities to discourage heavy traffic.

The BCDA held a design competition for the master conceptual development plan for Clark Green City with AECOM coming up with the winning design in 2015. Members of the screening committee included notable local and international urban planners and designers such as: Andrea Dorotan and Paul Letana of Bases Conversion Development Authority; Jezreel Apelar of Urban Land Institute; Julia Nebrija of World Bank; Grace Ramos of the University of the Philippines; Stephen Gray of Harvard University, Fadi Masoud of Massachusetts Institute of Technology and, Mary Anne Ocampo of international design firm Sasaki.

The city was officially founded on April 11, 2016 with the late President Aquino and Mr. Casanova breaking ground and leading the ceremonies and attended by international and local dignitaries and business leaders.

During Casanova's term, overall masterplan development plan was completed by BCDA. In laying the foundation for the city, he led the influx of businesses, educational and government institutions and global linkages with credible partners in development. BCDA also managed to forge partnership with foreign firms to develop Clark Green City such as Japan Overseas Infrastructure Investment Corp. which plans to connect Clark Green City to Manila as well as surrounding cities by rail, and IVL Swedish Environmental Research Institute which will assist the BCDA to come up with "smart and disaster-resilient" features for the planned community. An agreement was also signed between Paris-based Vivapolis.

To build the human capital of the new city, Casanova caused the donation by BCDA of 70 hectares of land for the new University of the Philippines campus, a 40 hectare property for the Technological University of the Philippines and the 20 hectares for the Philippine Science High School. He also sent to Singapore's Nanyang Technological University, 100 scholars including mayors and town planners of the towns surrounding the new city as well as BCDA core team for training on green city planning and governance under the auspices of the Temasek Foundation. He also initiated talks with the Rungis Market of France for an Asian food logistics hub in Clark Green City to ensure food security in the country and to connect Philippine farmers to the global market. He also led the investment of BCDA for the Luzon Bypass Line with the Department of Communications and Information Technology (then ICTO) and Facebook in exchange for 2tpbs bandwith to provide fast and free internet access to all government offices, schools and parks and to spark the movement of technopreneurs in the country.

To strengthen further the government support, Mr. Casanova sought the official support of the Philippine Congress. In March 2015, the Philippine Congress approved House Resolution 116 in support of Clark Green City.

After Casanova's tenure in BCDA ended, he joined AECOM as the firm's representative in the Philippines.

Development

The groundbreaking rites for New Clark City, led by then-President Benigno Aquino III was made on April 11, 2016. The development became one of the flagship projects of President Rodrigo Duterte, the succeeding President. Under the leadership of BCDA President Vince Dizon, the New Clark City entered development. In March 2018, the development of Phase 1-A of the National Government Administrative Center which consists of the New Clark City Sports Hub began and would serve as one of the venues to the country's hosting of the 2019 Southeast Asian Games. The sports facilities were completed in record time for the games.

In July 2020, the BCDA and the Department of Agriculture unveiled plans to put up an Agro-Industrial Hub in New Clark City aimed to support farming communities, and strengthen food security in Luzon.

The BCDA in September 2020 signed a memorandum of understanding with the British Embassy Manila for the design of NCC Central Park, as well as an affordable housing project in the new metropolis. A symbolic marker was unveiled in July 2021 at New Clark City by BCDA and the British Embassy Manila to ceremonially lay the foundation of the central park.

Naming 
The project was named "Clark" for marketing purposes for potential investors in the area. This naming decision was made despite being located in Tarlac and not in Pampanga, the location of the already existing Clark Freeport Zone, due to the latter being more known to foreign investors. The BCDA compared this with the situation of the Subic Bay Freeport Zone, which is located in Subic, Zambales and also covers portions of Olongapo, also in Zambales, and Morong and Hermosa in Bataan.

Initially named "Clark Green City," the planned city was renamed to the present "New Clark City" during the Duterte administration.

Geography
The development is located in the municipalities of Capas and Bamban, Tarlac province although it is administered from Angeles City as part of the Clark Special Economic Zone.

Natural hazards 
The Sierra Madre mountain range is located on the development's east while the Zambales mountain range is located on the west, with both geographical features providing New Clark City a natural protection from typhoons.

The Philippine Institute of Volcanology and Seismology has assessed the area to be relatively less prone to earthquakes.

Parks 
The Capas National Shrine, a memorial for Allied soldiers who perished at the Bataan Death March during World War II, is located at the entrance of the development. The site was a former concentration camp during the war. The New Clark City Central Park, a 44.8-hectare urban park, is planned to be located in the heart of the metropolis.

Aside from the two major parks, BCDA plans to allocate portions of NCC for green spaces. Out of 9,450 hectares of the city, only 3,500 hectares will be developed, leaving the rest for green and open spaces, making it a green city.

Districts
New Clark City is divided into various districts depending on primary function. As of 2022, there are three areas in the city with sizable on-going development.

National Government Administrative Center 

The National Government Administrative Center (NGAC), a  mixed-used development, hosts facilities and offices for the Philippine government. Located inside NGAC is the Integrated Operations and Disaster Recovery Center, intended to be backup operations center for the national government in case the capital Manila is incapacitated by disasters, and includes a satellite office of the Office of the President of the Philippines.

Sports Hub 

The New Clark City Sports Hub, located within the NGAC, contains an athletes' village for accommodation, an aquatics center, and the 20,000-seater New Clark City Athletics Stadium. It will also house the Olympic Museum by the Philippine Olympic Committee.

New Clark City was one of the host cities of the 2019 Southeast Asian Games, which took place all over Luzon.  The closing ceremony was held in the Athletics Stadium. These facilities were also to be used as the venues for the aquatics and athletics events in the 2020 ASEAN Para Games, before it was cancelled due to the COVID-19 pandemic.

In December 2019, BCDA, the Asian Swimming Federation, Philippine Swimming and Philippine Sports Commission signed a partnership agreement for the country's hosting of the 2020 Asian Swimming Championships which will be held in New Clark City.

In June 2021, in a lead up to the 2021 PFL Season, United City F.C. announced that it has adopted New Clark City in Capas, Tarlac as its home locality. It also has entered a partnership with the local government of Pampanga.

Filinvest New Clark City 
Filinvest New Clark City is a mixed-use and industrial district being developed under a joint venture agreement between BCDA and Filinvest Land. Covering a 288-hectare portion of NCC, the district will include the Innovation Park, a business hub which will host warehouse and factory facilities for logistics, e-commerce, light manufacturing, and data center operations of local and international businesses.

Hann Reserve 
450-hectare will be developed into a luxury mountain resort by Hann Development Corporation in collaboration with Accor, Marriott International, and the Professional Golfers’ Association of America (PGA). The resort will feature three 18-hole championship golf courses and PGA-affiliated player development facilities, hotels by Banyan Tree, Angsana, Sofitel, Emblems, The Luxury Collection, and The Westin, as well as a mixed-use commercial center, and a 10-hectare public park. The groundbreaking ceremony was held on November 5, 2022.

Education and research
The following institutions and agencies have either moved their operations, completely or partially, or have recently been established and constructed their first offices and facilities in New Clark City.

Basic and higher education institutions 

 Philippine Science High School – campus and large-scale fabrication laboratory
 National Academy of Sports
 University of the Philippines
 Technological University of the Philippines – TUP Center for Industrial Development and Productivity

Health and research 

 Virology Science and Technology Institute of the Philippines (Department of Science and Technology)
 Agro-Industrial Hub and National Seed Technology Park (Department of Agriculture)
 PGH Polyclinic (University of the Philippines – Philippine General Hospital)

Government 

 Bangko Sentral ng Pilipinas Currency Production Facility
 Supreme Court Judiciary Regional Center
 National Bureau of Investigation Regional Office

Transportation
New Clark City is connected to other areas in the Clark Freeport and Special Economic Zone through the Clark Loop, a bus rapid transit (BRT) system serving NCC, Clark International Airport, and other developments in the economic zone. It was opened in time for the 30th Southeast Asian Games.

New Clark City station, a planned railway station in the area, will be served by the Philippine National Railways' North–South Commuter Railway, connecting NCC to Metro Manila.

New Clark City will also be served by the Subic–Clark–Tarlac Expressway and Central Luzon Link Expressway specifically through the  six-lane New Clark City-Mac Arthur Access Road which will connect the NCC to MacArthur Highway.

See also 

 List of sporting events in New Clark City
 Clark Freeport and Special Economic Zone
 Clark Global City
 Clark International Airport
 Camp O'Donnell, Capas, Tarlac
 Bonifacio Global City – flagship project of BCDA

References

External links
 Official website

 
Planned communities in the Philippines
Redevelopment projects in the Philippines